Bin Qasim Town is a Constituent Town of Karachi, lying on the eastern part of the city, north of Port Qasim. Bin Qasim Town was formed in 2001 as part of The Local Government Ordinance 2001, and was subdivided into 7 union councils. The town system was disbanded in 2011, and Bin Qasim Town was re-organized as part of Karachi Malir District in 2015.

Location 
Bin Qasim Town was located in the southeastern part of Karachi along the Arabian Sea and the Indus River delta. The town and the adjacent Port Qasim were named after Muhammad bin Qasim, an Arab general who conquered Sindh and multan to establish an Islamic rule in the eighth century CE. Bin Qasim was bordered by Gadap Town to the north, Thatta District and the Indus River to the east, the Arabian Sea to the south and the Malir River and the towns of Landhi, Malir, and Korangi Cantonment to the west.  At the time of the 1998 census, the town had a population of about 315,000 people, 97% of whom were Muslims and represented a variety of ethnic groupings; Sindhis make up the majority in the town. Balochs, Kashmiris, Seraikis, Pakhtuns, Brahuis, Punjabis, Memons, Bohras, and Ismailis were among the town's other ethnic groups..

History 
The federal government introduced local government reforms in the year 2000, which eliminated the previous "third tier of government" (administrative divisions) and replaced it with the fourth tier (districts). The effect in Karachi was the dissolution of the former Karachi Division, and the merging of its five districts to form a new Karachi City-District with eighteen autonomous constituent towns including Bin Qasim Town. In 2011, the system was disbanded but remained in place for bureaucratic administration until 2015, when the Karachi Metropolitan Corporation system was reintroduced. In 2015, Bin Qasim Town was re-organized as part of Karachi Malir district.

Neighbourhoods of Bin Qasim Town

Trade and industry 
The port of Bin Qasim was built in the 1970s to relieve pressure on the Port of Karachi and is today the second largest port of Pakistan. The port is surrounded by a large industrial area which includes the Pakistan Steel Mills complex in Gulshan-e-Hadeed, Pakistan Machine Tool Factory (PMTF) and the Zulfiqarabad Oil Terminal as well as the nearby industrial estate in Landhi Town. The two neighbourhoods of Ibrahim Hyderi and Rehri are focussed on the fishing industry, complemented by the nearby Korangi Fish Harbour.

See also 
 Karachi Local Government
 Port Qasim

References

External links 
 Official Karachi Website
 Official Bin Qasim Webpage

 
Malir District
Towns in Karachi